Fancutt is a surname. Notable people with the surname include:

Charlie Fancutt (born 1959), Australian tennis player
Daphne Fancutt, married Daphne Seeney, (1933–2020), Australian tennis player
Michael Fancutt (born 1961), Australian tennis player
Trevor Fancutt (1934–2022), South African tennis player